Piyanut Pannoy (RTGS: Piyanut Paennoi, born November 10, 1989) is a Thai volleyball player who plays as a Libero for the Thailand women's national volleyball team . Piyanut is known for receiving different type of serves.

Career
She is on the list 2019 Korea-Thailand all star super match competition.

Clubs
  Bangkok (2008–2009)
  Chaiyaphum (2009–2010)
  Supreme Nakhonsi (2010–2012)
  Azerrail Baku (2011–2012)
  Supreme Chonburi (2012–2017)
  Altay Oskemen (2017–2018)
  Supreme Chonburi (2018–)

Awards

Individuals
 2010 Asian Games – "Best Receiver"
 2011 Asian Club Championship – "Best Libero"
 2013 Summer Universiade – "Best Digger"
 2014 China International – "Best Libero"
 2016 Thai-Denmark Super League – "Best Libero"
 2016 Montreux Volley Masters – "Best Libero"
 2016 Asian Cup – "Best Libero"
 2019 Asian Championship – "Best Libero"

Clubs
 2008–09 Thailand League –  Champion, with Bangkok
 2015–16 Thailand League –  Runner-up, with Supreme Chonburi
 2016–17 Thailand League –  Champion, with Supreme Chonburi
 2017 Thai-Denmark Super League –  Champion, with Supreme Chonburi
 2018 Thai-Denmark Super League –  Champion, with Supreme Chonburi
 2011–12 Azerbaijan Super League –  Runner-up, with Azerrail Baku
 2017–18 Kazakhstan Liga –  Champion, with Altay
 2010 Asian Club Championship –  Champion, with Federbrau
 2011 Asian Club Championship –  Champion, with Chang
 2012 Asian Club Championship –  Bronze medal, with Chang
 2017 Asian Club Championship –  Champion, with Supreme Chonburi
 2018 Asian Club Championship –  Champion, with Supreme Chonburi
 2019 Asian Club Championship –  Runner-up, with Supreme Chonburi

Royal decoration 
 2013 -  Commander (Third Class) of The Most Exalted Order of the White Elephant

References

External links

1989 births
Living people
Piyanut Pannoy
Thai expatriate sportspeople in Azerbaijan
Asian Games medalists in volleyball
Volleyball players at the 2010 Asian Games
Volleyball players at the 2014 Asian Games
Volleyball players at the 2018 Asian Games
Piyanut Pannoy
Piyanut Pannoy
Piyanut Pannoy
Piyanut Pannoy
Medalists at the 2014 Asian Games
Medalists at the 2018 Asian Games
Universiade medalists in volleyball
Piyanut Pannoy
Southeast Asian Games medalists in volleyball
Competitors at the 2011 Southeast Asian Games
Competitors at the 2013 Southeast Asian Games
Competitors at the 2015 Southeast Asian Games
Competitors at the 2017 Southeast Asian Games
Universiade bronze medalists for Thailand
Competitors at the 2019 Southeast Asian Games
Liberos
Medalists at the 2013 Summer Universiade
Competitors at the 2021 Southeast Asian Games
Piyanut Pannoy
Piyanut Pannoy
Thai expatriate sportspeople in Kazakhstan
Expatriate volleyball players in Azerbaijan
Expatriate volleyball players in Kazakhstan